Meno is a town in Major County, Oklahoma, United States. The population was 235 at the 2010 census, a 20.5 percent increase from the figure of 195 in 2000.

History
The town of Meno is named after Mennonite leader Menno Simons, and was founded on October 19, 1899  by David Koehn, who omitted one "n" when filling out the Post Office application form.  Jacob A. Wedel served as the first postmaster.  Meno was originally part of Woods county, until statehood in 1907, at which time it fell within Major County.  Many of the original inhabitants were Mennonites of Polish and Russian Mennonite descent. who established the New Hopedale Mennonite Church.  It was the previous home of Oklahoma Bible Academy, originally established in 1911 by the New Hopedale Mennonite Church as Meno Preparatory School, until it was moved to nearby Enid, Oklahoma in 1983.

In 1901-1902, the Enid and Anadarko Railway (later the Chicago, Rock Island and Pacific Railroad) constructed a line to connect the cities of Enid and Greenfield, which passed through Meno.  The first census in 1910 reported 69 residents. By 1918, the town boasted a bank, flour mill, two creameries, and two grain elevators.

Meno now serves as a bedroom community for people who commute to work in the Enid area.

Geography
Meno is located at  (36.388970, -98.177493).

Demographics

As of the census of 2000, there were 195 people, 78 households, and 56 families residing in the town. There were 87 housing units at an average density of 462.5 per square mile (176.8/km2). The racial makeup of the town was 92.82% White, 1.03% Native American, 2.05% from other races, and 4.10% from two or more races. Hispanic or Latino of any race were 3.59% of the population.

There were 78 households, out of which 33.3% had children under the age of 18 living with them, 69.2% were married couples living together, 2.6% had a female householder with no husband present, and 28.2% were non-families. 26.9% of all households were made up of individuals, and 20.5% had someone living alone who was 65 years of age or older. The average household size was 2.50 and the average family size was 3.04.

In the town, the population was spread out, with 26.7% under the age of 18, 5.6% from 18 to 24, 25.6% from 25 to 44, 18.5% from 45 to 64, and 23.6% who were 65 years of age or older. The median age was 40 years. For every 100 females, there were 85.7 males. For every 100 females age 18 and over, there were 88.2 males.

The median income for a household in the town was $32,750, and the median income for a family was $35,000. Males had a median income of $30,500 versus $19,688 for females. The per capita income for the town was $20,697. None of the families and 1.7% of the population were living below the poverty line, including no under eighteens and 7.0% of those over 64.

References

Towns in Major County, Oklahoma
Towns in Oklahoma